Cadwallon ap Cadfan (died 634) was the King of Gwynedd from around 625 until his death in battle. The son and successor of Cadfan ap Iago, he is best remembered as the King of the Britons who invaded and conquered the Kingdom of Northumbria, defeating and killing its king, Edwin, prior to his own death in battle against Oswald of Bernicia. His conquest of Northumbria, which he held for a year or two after Edwin died, made him one of the last recorded culturally traditional Celtic Britons to hold substantial territory in eastern Britain until the rise of the Welsh House of Tudor. He was thereafter remembered as a national hero by the Britons and as a tyrant by the Anglo-Saxons of Northumbria.

History
As with other figures of the era little is certainly known of Cadwallon's early life or reign. The primary source of information about him is the Ecclesiastical History of the English People of the Anglo-Saxon writer Bede, who is strongly critical of him. Cadwallon consistently appears in the genealogies of the Kings of Gwynedd as the son of Cadfan ap Iago and a descendant of Maelgwn Gwynedd and Cunedda. Historian Alex Woolf, however, presents the case that the genealogists have erroneously inserted Bede's Cadwallon into the pedigree of the unrelated Kings of Gwynedd as son of Cadfan. Instead, Woolf suggests that Bede's Cadwallon was the Catguallaun liu found in genealogies as son of Guitcun and grandson of Sawyl Penuchel, rulers in the Hen Ogledd or Brythonic-speaking area of northern Britain.

Whatever the case may be, Cadwallon was certainly affected by the ambitions of Edwin, King of Northumbria. Bede, writing about a century after Cadwallon's death, describes Edwin, the most powerful king in Britain, conquering the Brittonic kingdom of Elmet (what is now western Yorkshire) and ejecting its king, Cerdic. This opened the door to the Irish Sea, and Edwin successfully extended his rule to the "Mevanian Islands" – the Isle of Man and Anglesey. The Annales Cambriae says that Cadwallon was besieged at Glannauc (now Puffin Island, a small island off eastern Anglesey), and dates this to 629. Surviving Welsh poetry and the Welsh Triads portray Cadwallon as a heroic leader against Edwin. They refer to a battle at Digoll (Long Mountain) and mention that Cadwallon spent time in Ireland before returning to Britain to defeat Edwin.

According to Geoffrey of Monmouth's Historia Regum Britanniae (which includes a fairly extensive account of Cadwallon's life but is largely legendary—for example, Geoffrey has Cadwallon surviving until after the Battle of the Winwaed in 654 or 655), Cadwallon went to Ireland and then to the island of Guernsey. From there, according to Geoffrey, Cadwallon led an army into Dumnonia, where he encountered and defeated the Mercians besieging Exeter, and forced their king, Penda of Mercia, into an alliance. Geoffrey also reports that Cadwallon married a half-sister of Penda. However, his history is, on this as well as all matters, suspect, and it should be treated with caution.

In any case, Penda and Cadwallon together made war against the Northumbrians. The Battle of Hatfield Chase on 12 October 633 ended in the defeat and death of Edwin and his son Osfrith. After this, the Kingdom of Northumbria fell into disarray, divided between its sub-kingdoms of Deira and Bernicia, but the war continued: according to the Anglo-Saxon Chronicle, "Cadwallon and Penda went and did for the whole land of Northumbria". Bede says that Cadwallon was besieged by the new king of Deira, Osric, "in a strong town"; Cadwallon, however, "sallied out on a sudden with all his forces, by surprise, and destroyed him [Osric] and all his army."

After this, according to Bede, Cadwallon ruled over the "provinces of the Northumbrians" for a year, "not like a victorious king, but like a rapacious and bloody tyrant." Furthermore, Bede tells us that Cadwallon, "though he bore the name and professed himself a Christian, was so barbarous in his disposition and behaviour, that he neither spared the female sex, nor the innocent age of children, but with savage cruelty put them to tormenting deaths, ravaging all their country for a long time, and resolving to cut off all the race of the English within the borders of Britain." Bede's extremely negative portrayal of Cadwallon as a genocidal tyrant cannot be taken at face value. Cadwallon's alliance with the Anglo-Saxon Penda undermines Bede's assertion that Cadwallon had attempted to exterminate the English. Additionally, the fact that Cædwalla of Wessex a generation after Cadwallon's death bore a name derived directly from the British Cadwallon suggests that Cadwallon's reputation could not have been so poor among the Saxons of Wessex as it was in Northumbria.

The new king of Bernicia, Eanfrith, was also killed by Cadwallon when the former went to him in an attempt to negotiate peace. However, Cadwallon was defeated by an army under Eanfrith's brother, Oswald, at the Battle of Heavenfield, "though he had most numerous forces, which he boasted nothing could withstand". Cadwallon was killed at a place called "Denis's-brook".

See also
Kings of Wales family trees

Notes

References

Alex Woolf, "Caedualla Rex Brittonum and the Passing of the Old North", in Northern History, Vol. 41, Issue 1, March 2004, pages 5–24.

External links
 

6th-century births
634 deaths
Year of birth unknown
Anglo-Saxon warriors
Monarchs of Gwynedd
Medieval Welsh killed in battle
7th-century Welsh monarchs